Front or forward handspring vaults begin with a front handspring onto the vaulting table, followed by a salto. There are many variations of handspring vaults, including the handspring double salto forward tucked.

Sources

Vaults (gymnastics)